Luigi Martinelli may refer to:
 Luigi Martinelli (footballer)
 Luigi Martinelli (engineer)